Edwin Corbett (4 December 1819 – 22 February 1888) was a British diplomat who was envoy to several countries.

Career
Edwin Corbett graduated from Trinity College, Cambridge in 1843, joined the Diplomatic Service in 1847 and was attaché at Paris, Washington, D.C., Madrid and Copenhagen. He was Secretary of Legation at Florence in 1858, at Stockholm in 1860, at Frankfurt in 1862, and at Munich in 1865. In 1866 he was promoted to be chargé d'affaires and Consul-General to the Central American Republics (Guatemala, Nicaragua, Costa Rica, Honduras and Salvador), based in Guatemala City, and in 1873 he was promoted to Minister Resident and Consul-General for the same countries. He was Minister Resident to Switzerland 1874–78 and Envoy Extraordinary and Minister Plenipotentiary to Greece 1878–81, to Brazil 1881–84  and to Sweden and Norway 1884–1888.

Family
Edwin Corbett married Emily Isabella Dutton, daughter of James Dutton, 3rd Baron Sherborne. They had five children.

References
Edwin Corbett, ancestry.com
The New British Ministers, The Times, London, 2 January 1885, page 5
Obituary: Edwin Corbett, The Times, London, 24 February 1888, page 10

External links

1819 births
1888 deaths
Alumni of Trinity College, Cambridge
Ambassadors of the United Kingdom to Guatemala
Ambassadors of the United Kingdom to Switzerland
Ambassadors of the United Kingdom to Greece
Ambassadors of the United Kingdom to Brazil
Ambassadors of the United Kingdom to Sweden
Ambassadors of the United Kingdom to Norway